Know Thy Wife is a surviving 1918 silent comedy short film starring Dorothy Devore and produced by Al Christie.

Cast
Dorothy Devore - Betty Browning (*billed Dorothy De Vore)
Leota Lorraine - Lillian
Earle Rodney - Bob Browning

References

External links

Know Thy Wife available at YouTube

1918 films
American silent short films
Films directed by Al Christie
Silent American comedy films
1918 comedy films
1918 short films
American black-and-white films
American comedy short films
1910s American films